Guillermo Spamer (born 15 July 1952) is a Mexican rower. He competed in the men's single sculls event at the 1972 Summer Olympics.

References

1952 births
Living people
Mexican male rowers
Olympic rowers of Mexico
Rowers at the 1972 Summer Olympics
Place of birth missing (living people)